This is a list of railway industry occupations, but it also includes transient functional job titles according to activity.

By sector

Engineering
 Chief Mechanical Engineer
 Locomotive Superintendent (Chief Mechanical Engineer)
 Manager (Guard)

Station
 Station agent
 Senior Station Superintendent
 Station Superintendent
 Deputy Station Superintendent
 Selected Station Master
 Senior Station Master
 Junior Station master
 Deputy Station Master
 Assistant Station Master
 Pointsman
 Porter

Revenue
 Ticket controller
 Revenue Protection Inspector
 Ticket inspector

Operations
 Train dispatcher
 Dispatcher
 Freight Conductor
 Signalman

Management
 Road foreman of engines

Maintenance of way

 Bridge inspector
 Gandy dancer
 Length runner
 Railway lubricator
 Section gangs
 Signal maintainer
 Track inspector
 Traquero
 Platelayer
 Navvy (navigator)
 Track foreman
 Structure Maintainer
 Lighting Maintainer
 Escalator and Elevator Maintainer
 Electronic Equipment Maintainer
 Telephone Maintainer
 Turnstiles Maintainer
 Mechanical Maintainer Group "C"
 Mechanical Maintainer Group "B"
 Power Maintainer

Alphabetical

B
 Boilerman
 Brakeman
 Bridge inspector
 Bridge tender

C
 Chief Mechanical Engineer
 Chief fireman
 Conductor
 Carmen

D
 Dispatcher
 Train dispatching

E
 Engine driver

F
 Fettler: Railway Maintenance Worker
 Fireman
 Flagman
 Freight Conductor

G
 Ganger
 Geoff
 Geotechnical Engineer

L
 Length runner
 Locomotive Superintendent (Chief Mechanical Engineer)
 Locomotive engineer

P
 Platelayer
 Porter

R
 Railroad engineer (engine driver)
 Railway lubricator
 Revenue Protection Inspector
 Road foreman of engines

S
 Section gang
 Secondman
 Signal maintainer
 Signalman
 Station agent
 Station master

T
 Track foreman

See also
 Rail transport operations
 Lists of occupations

References

External links
Railroad Workers : Occupational Outlook Handbook

Occupations
 
Rail